Geoffrey Garrett is an Australian political scientist, academic administrator, and the current dean of the University of Southern California Marshall School of Business. He has served as a professor of political science at the University of Oxford, Stanford University, Yale University, the University of California, Los Angeles (UCLA), the University of Southern California (USC) and the University of Sydney. He was also the dean of the University of Sydney Business School and the University of New South Wales Business School (UNSW Business School). He was the dean of the Wharton School of the University of Pennsylvania from July 2014 until June 2020.

On July 1, 2020, Garrett became the 18th dean of the USC Marshall School of Business.

Early life
Geoffrey Garrett was born in Australia, and he graduated from the Australian National University. He was a Fulbright Scholar at Duke University, where he earned a master's degree and a PhD in 1990.

Career
Garrett was a fellow in politics at University College, Oxford, from 1986 to 1988. He joined the Department of Political Science at Stanford University as an assistant professor in 1988, and rose to tenured full professor in 1997. He was a professor of Political Science at Yale University from 1999 to 2001, and a professor of Political Science at the University of California, Los Angeles (UCLA) from 2001 to 2005. He was also the dean of the UCLA International Institute and vice provost of international studies. He was professor of international relations, business administration, communication and law at the University of Southern California from 2005 to 2008, and the president of the Pacific Council on International Policy from 2005 to 2009.

Garrett returned to Australia in 2009, where he was a professor of political science at the University of Sydney and the founding CEO of its United States Studies Centre from 2008 to 2012. He was the dean of the University of Sydney Business School from 2012 to 2013, and the dean of the Australian School of Business, now known as the UNSW Business School, from 2013 to 2014. Garrett succeeded Thomas S. Robertson as the dean of the Wharton School of the University of Pennsylvania on 1 July 2014. He was also the Reliance Professor of Management and Private Enterprise in the Management Department at Wharton and Professor of Political Science.

He serves on the advisory board of Global Policy.

Garrett rejoined the University of Southern California as the Marshall School Dean, Robert R. Dockson Dean’s Chair in Business Administration, and Professor of Management and Organization on July 1, 2020 

Garrett serves on the boards of advisors of the Indian School of Business and the Tsinghua University School of Economics and Management. He is also a fellow of the Academy of the Social Sciences in Australia.

Controversy
After several of USC Professor Greg Patton's students complained to the university about the professor using a common Chinese Mandarin filler word during academic lecture that equated to the English word "that", which the students mistook for a racial pejorative, Geoffrey Garrett advised students that the professor would no longer be teaching the course. "It is simply unacceptable for the faculty to use words in class that can marginalize, hurt and harm the psychological safety of our students," he said. Other USC students backed Prof Greg Patton's academic use of the word, with many on social media noting that Prof Patton's punishment appeared to be discrimination against speakers of Chinese.

Works

References

External links 
 Geoffrey Garrett on Google Scholar

Living people
Australian National University alumni
Duke University alumni
Australian political scientists
Fellows of University College, Oxford
People educated at Canberra Grammar School
Stanford University faculty
Yale University faculty
University of California, Los Angeles faculty
University of Southern California faculty
Academic staff of the University of Sydney
Wharton School of the University of Pennsylvania faculty
Business school deans
Fellows of the Academy of the Social Sciences in Australia
Year of birth missing (living people)